Abdulellah Hawsawi (born 1 November 1986) is a Saudi Arabian footballer who plays as a forward.

Career
He formerly played for Al-Ahli, Al-Raed, Al-Hazem, Al-Ansar, Al-Nahda, Al-Qadsiah,  Al-Wahda, Al-Fayha, and Abha.

References

External links
 

1986 births
Living people
Saudi Arabian footballers
Olympic footballers of Saudi Arabia
Association football forwards
Al-Ahli Saudi FC players
Al-Raed FC players
Al-Hazem F.C. players
Al-Ansar FC (Medina) players
Al-Nahda Club (Saudi Arabia) players
Al-Qadsiah FC players
Al-Wehda Club (Mecca) players
Al-Fayha FC players
Abha Club players
Saudi Professional League players
Saudi First Division League players
Saudi Second Division players